The K-class trams were a single truck all crossbench design, with closed compartments at one end and open seating at the other operated on the Sydney tram network. Withdrawals commenced in 1939. By 1949, only 1295 and 1296 remained in service on the Neutral Bay line, being withdrawn in the mid-1950s. Two were sold as track scrubbers in 1959 to Melbourne.

Preservation
Two have been preserved:
Nos. 1295 and 1296 were preserved at the Sydney Tramway Museum. However, 1295 was destroyed by fire during a vandalism attack in 2016.

References

Further reading

External links

Trams in Sydney
Tram vehicles of Australia